Sand-e Nur Mohammad (also Romanized as Sand-e Nūr Moḩammad; also known as Sand, Sand Bāhū, Sand-e Bāhū, and Sīşad) is a village in Bahu Kalat Rural District, Dashtiari District, Chabahar County, Sistan and Baluchestan Province, Iran. At the 2006 census, its population was 637, in 103 families.

References 

Populated places in Chabahar County